Hotel Troy is a historic commercial building located in Troy, Montgomery County, North Carolina.  It was built in 1908–1909, and is a three-story, seven bay by eight bay, brick building, rising above a full basement with Classical Revival style design elements.  The front facade features cast iron pilasters, columns with foliated capitals and cornices.  Originally built for multi-purpose use including a sanitorium, in 1925, rooms in the upper stories were modified for use as hotel rooms and baths. The hotel became a rooming house in the 1950s and finally closed in 1970.

It was added to the National Register of Historic Places in 2006.

References

Commercial buildings on the National Register of Historic Places in North Carolina
Neoclassical architecture in North Carolina
Commercial buildings completed in 1909
Buildings and structures in Montgomery County, North Carolina
National Register of Historic Places in Montgomery County, North Carolina